The 2017 Annual King's Cup Football Tournament, commonly referred to as 2017 King's Cup, was the 45th King's Cup, the annual international men's football tournament organised by Football Association of Thailand. It was held in Bangkok, Thailand, from 14 to 16 July 2017.

The matches were played at Rajamangala Stadium in Bangkok. As hosts, Thailand participated automatically in the tournament; they were joined by the African team Burkina Faso, the Asian team North Korea and the European team Belarus.

The defending champions, Thailand, who won the previous fourteen King's Cup, defended their title. Burkina Faso and Belarus made their debuts. Burkina Faso were represented by their African Nations Championship team, composed of domestic league players. Belarus were represented by their B-team, composed of domestic league players. North Korea were represented by several their B-team and a few A-team players.

Participant teams
The following teams have participated for the tournament.

1 FIFA Ranking as of 6 July 2017.
2  and  making their debut.
3  will be represented by their domestic national team.
4  will be represented by their B-team

Teams profile

Venue
All matches held at the Rajamangala Stadium in Bangkok, Thailand

Draw

The draw will be held on 3 July 2017, at the Thairath Headquarter in Bangkok, Thailand. Suppasin Leelarit, vice president of Football Association of Thailand and Watchara Watcharapol, chief executive officer of Thairath TV will participate in the draw.

The 4 teams are drawn into two matches, with hosts Thailand being allocated to bottom half (semi-finals 2).

Squads

Matches
All times are local, Indochina Time (UTC+7)

Match rules
90 minutes.
Penalty shoot-out after a draw in 90 minutes.
Maximum of three substitutions.

Bracket

Semi-finals

Third place play-off

Final

Winners

Goalscorers
2 goals
 Lassina Traoré
1 goal

 Ismaël Zagré
 Myong Cha-hyon
 Pak Song-chol
 Rim Kwang-hyok
 Mongkol Tossakrai
 Teeratep Winothai
 Thitipan Puangchan

Final ranking

FIFA ranking
The Union of European Football Associations (UEFA) sent a letter of confirmation to the Football Association of Thailand. UEFA has no objection to participation of Belarus (domestic-league players) in this tournament.

The Football Federation of Belarus will register for the tier-2 international match, which will record the result without FIFA scoring. The remaining three teams will register for the tier-1 international match.

Sponsorship

External links
Football Association of Thailand – FAT official site
Football Association of Thailand – FIFA site
Belarus Football Federation – FIFA site
Fédération Burkinabé de Foot-Ball – FIFA site
DPR Korea Football Association – FIFA site
Regulations Governing International Matches

References

2017
2017 in Thai football cups
Sport in Bangkok
July 2017 sports events in Asia